Icelus spatula, or the spatulate sculpin, is a marine fish in the family Cottidae. It can be found throughout the Arctic and the Northwestern Atlantic.

Description 
Juveniles of the species have two dark colored patches on their body. As they age, these patches break up to form intermittent brown spots. The tail fin is also speckled, while the anal and pelvic fins are uncolored. The average length is 12.9 cm, with a maximum reported age of seven years.

References 

spatula

Species described in 1912
Fish described in 1912